Sandomir may refer to:

 Richard Sandomir, American journalist
 Sandomierz, a town in south-eastern Poland